The Brothers' Quarrel was a war of succession within the Árpád dynasty between Emeric, King of Hungary and his younger brother, Andrew, Duke of Slavonia. It lasted from 1197 to 1203, covering almost the entire reign of Emeric. The conflict had a significant impact on the development of the 13th-century society and political system in the Kingdom of Hungary.

Background
The illustrious Béla III ruled Hungary from 1172 to 1196. His first wife was Agnes of Antioch, the mother of all Béla's children. Their first child and son Emeric was born in 1174, according to genealogist Mór Wertner, which was accepted by Hungarian historiography unanimously. Historian György Szabados argued it is possible that Agnes gave birth to her eldest son already in late 1170, still in the Byzantine Empire, where Béla (also known as Alexios in the Byzantine court) had already been there for seven years at the time of the marriage in the spring of the same year. Andrew was the second son of Béla III and Agnes. The year of his birth is not known, but modern historians agree that he was born around 1177, considering that Margaret, who was born in 1175 or 1176, was his elder sister, which, however, is far from certain. Béla and Agnes had two other sons, Solomon and Stephen. One of them was still alive in early 1198.

In order to ensure the uninterrupted succession to the Hungarian throne, Béla III decided to crown his eldest son during his lifetime. The still child Emeric was crowned king by Nicholas, Archbishop of Esztergom on 16 May 1182, as the contemporary chronicler Geoffroy du Breuil narrates in his work. This method was unusual within the Árpád dynasty, which was plagued by many struggles for the throne throughout its history. After Solomon (1057) and Stephen II (1105), only Emeric was the third heir to the throne who was crowned during the lifetime of his father, the reigning monarch. Béla III appointed Emeric to administer Croatia and Dalmatia around 1193 or 1194. Historian Gyula Kristó claimed Emeric's coronation in 1182 was forced against his father by the most powerful barons of the realm. In contrast, Szabados argued that Emeric did not independently issue a royal charter and did not have his own court. Bálint Hóman considered Béla crowned his eldest son as co-monarch in the manner of the Byzantine emperors. Croatian historian Ferdo Šišić believed that Emeric was crowned as King of Croatia and Dalmatia in 1194, separately.

Following Béla's successful invasion of the Principality of Halych in 1188, the younger son Andrew was installed as Prince of Halych. His nominal reign unpopular and the loyal boyars expelled Andrew and his retinue from the principality in August 1189 or 1190. Returning to Hungary, Andrew did not receive a separate duchy from his father, who only gave him some fortresses, estates and money. According to historian Attila Zsoldos, these landholdings laid in Slavonia. On his deathbed, Béla III, who had pledged to lead a crusade to the Holy Land, ordered Andrew to fulfill his vow. Béla III died on 23 April 1196, and Emeric succeeded him as King of Hungary without opposition.

Dynastic conflict

Andrew's first conspiracy (1197)

Andrew used the funds that he inherited from his father to recruit supporters among the Hungarian lords. It is plausible that he demanded from his brother to install him as Duke of Slavonia, which became increasingly the title of heir to the throne by the second half of the 12th century. Andrew also formed an alliance with Leopold VI, Duke of Austria, and they plotted against Emeric. The king learned of the conspiracy and filed a complaint against his brother to Pope Celestine III, who threatened with excommunication those who supported the duke against Emeric. A record of the Annals of Admont notes that "Andrew, who is called the Crusader, attacked his brother Henry [Emeric], the king of the Hungarians". The united troops of Andrew and Leopold routed the Hungarian royal army at Mački (Macsek), Slavonia, in the late autumn of 1197. Under duress, King Emeric gave Croatia and Dalmatia to Andrew as an appanage, as most historians believe. In contrast, historian György Szabados claimed that Emeric never acknowledged Andrew's dominion in Croatia and Dalmatia, who – as Szabados considered – arbitrarily used the title of Duke. As historians István Katona and Bálint Hóman argued Andrew seized the province with force. Series of privilege letters in favor of Dalmatian coastal cities and ecclesiastical institutions prove that King Emeric intended to exercise his royal rights as King of Croatia and Dalmatia, regardless of whether Andrew held the ducal title with or without his approval.

In practice, Andrew administered Croatia and Dalmatia as an independent and sovereign monarch. He styled himself, "By the grace of God, Duke of Zadar and of all Dalmatia, Croatia and Hum" in his charters. Taking advantage of Miroslav of Hum's death, Andrew invaded Hum and occupied at least the land between the Cetina and Neretva rivers sometime before May 1198, expanding his realm. He minted coins, granted land and confirmed privileges. In accordance with the treaty with Emeric, Varaždin and Bodrog counties also belonged to his suzerainty. He cooperated with the Frankopans, Babonići, and other local lords. Some of the prominent barons also supported his aspirations, including comes Andrew, the husband of princess Margaret (the aunt of Emeric and Andrew) and Macarius Monoszló. Andrew appointed his own bans – at first, the aforementioned Andrew – to administer his province, neglecting Emeric's royal prerogatives. Andrew acted as "caput ecclesiae in regno suo" (head of the church in his own country) over the Dalmatian ecclesiastical institutions. Already in 1198, he donated privileges to the Archdiocese of Split and the St. John monastery at Biograd. He also attempted to fill the then-vacant archiepiscopal sees of Split and Zadar with prelates who were loyal to him. Both elections occurred already in 1198. Pope Innocent III, who strongly supported Emeric in his feud against Andrew, refused to confirm these elections and ordered investigation regarding the candidates' political relationship with the duke. In the upcoming years, The Holy See successfully prevented that Andrew's partisans occupy the ecclesiastical positions in Dalmatia. Overall, the local churches and cities attempted to maintain their neutrality during the feud between Emeric and Andrew. In several cases, the two brothers both issued the same grant to a particular church, since the clerics felt important to get confirmation both from their in order to keep the safeguard their rights and neutrality. Blaise, the chief notary of Zadar acknowledged Emeric as "our sovereign", while Andrew was referred to as only "duke" then "the king's brother, who is present in Dalmatia".

Pope Innocent III strongly supported Emeric during the brothers' quarrel. He instructed the archbishops and bishops of Hungary that no one should excommunicate or interdict the king's confidants, especially his chief supporter since his father's death, Ugrin Csák, Bishop of Győr. Weeks after his election, Innocent sent a letter to Andrew on 29 January 1198, in which he urged Andrew to lead a crusade to the Holy Land in order to fulfill his vow. He threatened that if Andrew refused to fulfill his father's last will, he would be excommunicated and lose his status as heir to the Hungarian throne (Emeric did not have a child then) in favor of his younger brother (Solomon or Stephen).

Andrew's second conspiracy (1198–1199)

Despite the clear position of the Holy See, several prelates were considered supporters of Andrew. Already in January 1198, Pope Innocent rebuked John, the abbot of Pannonhalma Abbey, for conspiring with the duke against Emeric and ordered him to appear before the Roman Curia in person. However, the conspiracy continued against the king, which escalated in the spring of 1199. One of the pro-Andrew prelates, Boleslaus, Bishop of Vác complained to the Roman Curia that while the bishop and his canons celebrated a mass at the cathedral of Vác on 10 March 1199, Emeric and his soldiers violently broke into the building. The king himself physically assaulted Boleslaus, while his troops broke the lock, looted the treasury and confiscated numerous documents, which allegedly contained the preparations for a planned conspiracy against the monarch. Pope Innocent sent a letter to Emeric on 21 June 1199, in which he called on the king to reimburse the material damage to the cathedral and to compensate Boleslaus, unless he will impose an ecclesiastical penalty on Emeric (excommunication) and the kingdom (interdict). On the same day, Pope Innocent instructed Saul Győr, the Archbishop of Kalocsa to investigate the events and oversee that the king is carrying out the compensation. Initially, Emeric prevented the visitation of Saul to the royal court, hindering his mission.

Emeric denied any physical abuse in his reply letter, according to him, the canons of the cathedral chapter voluntarily opened the gate, and Boleslaus' involvement in the conspiracy was revealed. The king narrated in his letter to Pope Innocent that the bishop maintained relationship and corresponded with Duke Andrew and the other conspirators, and guarded their group's funds at the cathedral of Vác in order to finance their rebellion against Emeric. Since after the incident and the subsequent civil war, several barons defected to the court of Duke Andrew, it is plausible the king had good reason to open the cathedral treasury, according to Szabados. In his letter, Emeric also narrated that Mog, Palatine of Hungary secretly swore loyalty to Andrew, but he was deprived of his office, when his betrayal was revealed. Mog's defection encouraged Andrew to rebel against his rule and make an attempt to gain the Hungarian throne. When Emeric attempted to appoint his partisan Mika Ják as the new palatine, Boleslaus' brother, Elvin, Bishop of Várad excommunicated the lord, because he had formerly captured one of the bishopric's priests, who functioned as a messenger of the king's enemies who supported Duke Andrew. Emeric claimed the neglect of Saul Győr was due to the safety of the archbishop, whose lives would have been endangered by the adherents of the pro-Andrew prelates in the royal court.

After the plot was uncovered, a civil war broke out between Emeric and Andrew. During the clashes, the Diocese of Zagreb (in Slavonia) suffered heavy damage. In the summer of 1199, royal troops routed Andrew's army in the valley of Rád near Lake Balaton in Somogy County, and Andrew fled to Austria, where Duke Leopold sheltered him and his retinue. In retaliation, Emeric's advancing army ransacked and plundered the Austrian and Styrian border region along Hungary. Thereafter, Emeric took steps to bring Croatia and Dalmatia back under his control. He appointed his former tutor Bernard of Perugia, the Archbishop of Split as the royal governor of the coastal city. The name of Andrew disappeared from the datation style as used by notaries of Dalmatian cities, including Zadar in the second half of 1199. Emeric also installed his partisans Nicholas then Benedict as bans of Croatia and Dalmatia. For the losses of his diocese, Emeric compensated Dominic, Bishop of Zagreb with several privileges and tax exemptions in 1199–1200.

First reconciliation (1200–1203)
The most important matter for Pope Innocent was the initiation of the crusade, so he urged reconciliation between the two brothers. The Chronica regia Coloniensis narrates that the pope sent Conrad of Wittelsbach, the Archbishop of Mainz from Italy to Hungary in order to mediate between Emeric and Andrew. The parties held a meeting and came to an agreement with Leopold, and all the nobles of Hungary, and thus concluded a peace: both Emeric and Andrew vowed to launch a crusade to the Holy Land, while Hungary was entrusted to the guardianship of Leopold on their departure. And if one of them perishes in overseas parts, the surviving brother shall possess the father's kingdom upon his return (i.e. Emeric still did not have a son). In a papal letter with the date March 1200, Cardinal Gregorius de Crescentio also appeared as a negotiator during the brothers' reconciliation. The report of the Continuatio Claustroneuburgensis says that "the king of Hungary made peace with the duke of Austria and accepted his younger brother back into the joint reign" in 1200. Austrian historian Alfons Huber considered this meant a return to the previous territorial separation, so Andrew did not become co-ruler. Szabados viewed Pope Innocent III as the real beneficiary of the treaty, which reflects the growing influence of the Holy See over Hungary. For Innocent, it seemed much more reassuring that the launch of the much-advocated crusade did not depend solely on a frivolous prince, but also that the monarch of an important European power had sworn to take part in the holy war.

The peace treaty of 1200 resulted that Andrew not only re-established his power in Croatia and Dalmatia, but emerged stronger than ever. For instance, in charters issued by Blaise, the notary of Zadar, the name of Emeric is not mentioned at all, while Andrew is styled as "our lord" together with his ducal titles. From the fall of 1200, Andrew's own charters have survived in the region. He again installed bans to administer his province – at first Nicholas then Martin Hont-Pázmány. The ex-palatine Mog also belonged to his entourage. The reconciliation brought three years of peace to Slavonia and Croatia. Andrew might have started minting coins during this time. He married Gertrude of Merania sometime between 1200 and 1203; his father-in-law Berthold owned extensive domains in the Holy Roman Empire along the borders of Andrew's duchy. Gertrude's influence and political involvement are clearly shown by the fact that when Emeric defeated his brother again in 1203 (see below), he found it necessary to send Gertrude back to her native land Merania.

Emeric pursued an active foreign policy in the Balkans after 1200, since Pope Innocent urged him to take measures to liquidate the "heretics" in Bosnia. Although he pledged himself to join the Fourth Crusade, the crusaders (mostly Venetians), however, besieged and captured Zadar in November 1202. Pope Innocent was informed in early 1203 that Emeric prepared for a crusade. Therefore, the pope gestured for the king in February 1203: under the burden of excommunication, he ordered the ecclesiastical and secular dignitaries to swear loyalty to the legal heir to the Hungarian throne, the child Ladislaus (who was born sometime after 1200). Innocent later heard similar news from apart of Andrew in early November 1203. The pope declared that he would place all Andrew's possessions and wealth, which he rightfully possessed, under the protection of the Holy See, and would protect them until he received news of his return or death. He also declared that if Andrew had a son in the meantime, that child would inherit the duchy. However, Innocent's last letter proved to be out of date, as by then another conflict had arisen between the two brothers.

Scene of Varaždin (1203)

The relationship between the two brothers led to a third conflict in the fall of 1203, but the circumstances of its outbreak are unclear due to conflicting information. The Continuatio Claustroneuburgensis narrates that "Emeric, the king of Hungary – even though he gave his word to his brother through monks – tricked him into captivity and imprisoned him [Andrew] forever". Italian scholar Boncompagno da Signa's tractate Rhetorica novissima contains a letter of Duke Leopold VI of Austria, in which the monarch mentions that Emeric imprisoned Andrew "for no reason". The Annals of Admont records that Emeric crowned his child Ladislaus, "who was not even three years old", imprisoned Andrew, "suspecting that he is preparing to attack the realm", and  guarded him in the palace of Esztergom. Emeric also expelled Andrew's spouse Gertrude into her homeland and stripped of her possessions. Thomas the Archdeacon tells a different story in his chronicle Historia Salonitana decades later: accordingly, Duke Andrew once again rose up in open rebellion against Emeric. Their armies met at Varaždin (Varasd) in Slavonia on the river Drava in October 1203. Emeric walked into his brother's camp unarmed, stating, "Now I shall see who will dare to raise a hand to shed the blood of the royal lineage!" Nobody ventured to stop the king; thus, he approached Andrew and seized him without resistance.

It is highly disputed among historians which narration to accept as authentic. 19th-century scholar Gyula Pauler combined the records, considering that, with an ulterior motive, Emeric called his younger brother to consult, where upon his arrival, he captured him with the royal scepter in hand without bloodshed. His contemporary Flórián Mátyás accepted the Claustroneuburgensis tradition, while Gyula Kristó presented both versions without taking a position. In contrast, György Szabados accepted Thomas the Archdeacon's narration as reliable. He considered that the Continuatio Claustroneuburgensis represents a pro-Andrew point of view and Emeric's death is listed twice both times under the wrong date (1203 and 1205), thus the authenticity of the narration is debatable. He argued, although the Historia Salonitana represents a pro-Emeric position, but the work itself was compiled sometime around 1266, when Emeric and his branch died out a long time ago (in 1205), therefore, there was no reason to distort the truth. Pope Innocent's letter also proves that preparations for military campaign took place in Hungary during 1203, but instead of joining the Fourth Crusade, a war took place between the two brothers. Tamás Körmendi rejected Szabados' argument. He emphasized that the subsequent letters of Pope Innocent do not mention the fact of warfare between the two brothers, and the pointiff even reprimanded Emeric in his letter of September 1204 for imprisoning his younger brother. In addition, Thomas the Archdeacon does not mention the preparation for the crusade at all in his narrative. Körmendi argued the chronicler mostly used the historical records and charters of the cathedral chapter of Split as main sources of his work. This documents perhaps represented a staunch pro-Emeric standpoint, because Bernard of Perugia, the former tutor of the king served as Archbishop of Split during the brothers' quarrel. Croatian historian Mladen Ančić emphasized the allegorical character of the story. The chronicler did not aim to provide authentic information in this case, but wished to express an idealized image of royal power. Attila Zsoldos argued it was the king who turned against his brother's province with an army initially convened for a crusade due to existing mistrust. Following Andrew's arrest, Emeric installed his partisan Ipoch Bogátradvány as the new Ban of Croatia and Dalmatia.

Aftermath
Andrew was first imprisoned in the fort of Gornji Kneginec (Kene), then in Esztergom. Having fallen seriously ill, Emeric wanted to ensure the succession of his four-year-old son, Ladislaus. His staunch supporter Ugrin Csák was elected Archbishop of Esztergom in the spring of 1204. Pope Innocent authorized Ugrin to crown Ladislaus and to invalidate the ill Emeric's pilgrimage oath to the Holy Land in April 1204. Meanwhile, Andrew was freed from captivity in the early months of 1204. It is uncertain whether Andrew was liberated by his partisans – including Alexander Hont-Pázmány – or his release took place with Emeric's consent. As Ladislaus was crowned only in August 1204, it is plausible that Emeric decided on Andrew's release, therefore, the coronation was not vitally urgent. Andrew reconciled with his dying brother, who entrusted him with "the guardianship of his son and the administration of the entire kingdom until the ward should reach the age of majority".

Emeric died on 30 November 1204. The child Ladislaus III ascended the Hungarian throne under the regency of his uncle, Duke Andrew. The subsequent letters of Pope Innocent III suggest that serious tensions burdened the relationship between Andrew and the queen mother Constance of Aragon after Emeric's death. Andrew confiscated a significant portion of private wealth from Constance and had free control over the royal treasury. Constance fled from Hungary, taking her son and the Holy Crown to Austria in the spring of 1205. According to the Annals of Admont, "some bishops and nobles" escorted them, breaking through the blockade that Andrew erected along the Austrian border. Andrew prepared for a war against Leopold VI, but Ladislaus III suddenly died in Vienna on 7 May 1205. Twenty-two days later, Andrew II was crowned King of Hungary. His descendants ruled Hungary and Croatia until the extinction of the Árpád dynasty in 1301 and even further on the maternal side.

Impact
Taking advantage of the civil war in Hungary, Kaloyan of Bulgaria invaded and captured Belgrade, Barancs (now Braničevo in Serbia), and other fortresses in 1204. Emeric made preparations for a campaign against Bulgaria, but he disbanded his army upon Pope Innocent's demand. The pope, who had been negotiating a church union with Kaloyan, sent a royal crown to him, but Emeric imprisoned the papal legate who was delivering the crown to Bulgaria when the legate was passing through Hungary.

Unlike the former claimants to the Hungarian throne, for instance Prince Álmos, Boris Kalamanos and Géza, son of Géza II of Hungary, Andrew could not count on the support of one of the great powers of the region, i.e. the Holy Roman Empire and the Byzantine Empire because of their anarchic domestic conditions, the German throne dispute and the chaotic rule of the Angelos dynasty, respectively. Consequently, in his rebellion against the king, his brother Emeric, he had to rely on the support of the Hungarian nobles to a much greater extent than his predecessors who claimed the throne. An increase in the donation of royal estates into private hands after his coronation, and thus the change in the Hungarian social structure, may be a sign of subsequent gratitude and payment. In addition, Andrew also had to realize that he could not do without the expertise of Emeric's former barons in governance. For his staunch supporters, a younger generation of the elite, Andrew established new court positions (i.e. Master of the horse). The fault line between the members of the "old" and the "new" elites became permanent, and the exclusivity of royal power ceased.

References

Sources

Primary sources

Archdeacon Thomas of Split: History of the Bishops of Salona and Split (Latin text by Olga Perić, edited, translated and annotated by Damir Karbić, Mirjana Matijević Sokol and James Ross Sweeney) (2006). CEU Press. .

Secondary sources

 
 
 
 
 
 
 
 

Conflicts in 1197
Conflicts in 1199
Conflicts in 1203
1190s in Europe
1200s in Europe
12th century in Hungary
13th century in Hungary
Civil wars of the Middle Ages
Wars involving Hungary
Wars of succession involving the states and peoples of Europe